Professor Gautam Chabukswar is Shiv Sena politician from Pune district, Maharashtra. He is a member of the 13th Maharashtra Legislative Assembly. He represents the Pimpri Assembly Constituency. He defeated sitting MLA  Anna Bansode who contested from Nationalist Congress Party along with other 23 candidates. He has completed LLB, B.Com., M.Phil., and M.A. in Pune. He is former SINET member in Savitribai Phule, Pune University and currently Professor in Pune University in Pali Department.

Positions held
 Former boxing champion (national level)
 1986 to 2007 elected as corporator
 Member in Standing Committee of PCMC for 5 years
 1987-88 Vice President (UpSabhapati) of Education in Municipal Corporation
 Member of PCMT for 3 years
 Member of Pimpri Chinchwad Navnagar Pradhikaran for 5 years 
 President of Pimpri Boxing Association
 Founder Rahul Academy (boxing/football) in PCMC
 Deputy Mayor of Municipal Corporation from 2005 to 2007
 Elected to Congress in 2012, re-elected 5 times
 2014: Elected to Maharashtra Legislative Assembly from Shivsena
 2016: CINET Member in Pune University
 Professor in Pune University (Pali Department)

See also
 Maval Lok Sabha constituency

References

|https://m.timesofindia.com/city/pune/pune-pimpri-mla-urges-civic-administration-for-construction-of-flyover/articleshow/58977821.cms|

External links
 Shiv Sena Official website

Maharashtra MLAs 2014–2019
Living people
Shiv Sena politicians
People from Pimpri-Chinchwad
Marathi politicians
Year of birth missing (living people)